Tirpitzia is a genus of flowering plants belonging to the family Linaceae. It is also in the subfamily Linoideae.

Its native range is southern China to Vietnam and Taiwan.

The genus name of Tirpitzia is in honour of Alfred von Tirpitz (1849–1930), a German grand admiral, Secretary of State of the German Imperial Naval Office. It was first described and published in Beih. Bot. Centralbl. Vol.39 (Issue 2) on page 5 in 1921.

Known species
According to Kew:
 Tirpitzia bilocularis Suksathan & K.Larsen 
 Tirpitzia ovoidea Chun & F.C.How ex W.L.Sha 
 Tirpitzia sinensis (Hemsl.) Hallier f.

References

Linaceae
Malpighiales genera
Plants described in 1921
Flora of South-Central China
Flora of Southeast China
Flora of Taiwan
Flora of Vietnam